An explanation is a set of statements usually constructed to describe a set of facts which clarifies the causes, context, and consequences of those facts. It may establish rules or laws, and may clarify the existing rules or laws in relation to any objects or phenomena examined.

Explanation, in philosophy, is a set of statements that makes intelligible the existence or occurrence of an object, event, or state of affairs. Among its most common forms are:
 Causal explanation
 Deductive-nomological explanation, which involves subsuming the explanandum under a generalization from which it may be derived in a deductive argument (e.g., “All gases expand when heated; this gas was heated; therefore, this gas expanded”)
 Statistical explanation, which involves subsuming the explanandum under a generalization that gives it inductive support (e.g., “Most people who use tobacco contract cancer; this person used tobacco; therefore, this person contracted cancer”).
Explanations of human behaviour typically appeal to the subject’s beliefs and desires, as well as other facts about him, and proceed on the assumption that the behaviour in question is rational (at least to a minimum degree). Thus an explanation of why the subject removed his coat might cite the fact that the subject felt hot, that the subject desired to feel cooler, and that the subject believed that he would feel cooler if he took off his coat.

Scientific explanation

A presupposition of most recent discussion has been that science sometimes provides explanations (rather than  “mere description”) and that the task of a “theory” or “model” of scientific explanation is to characterize the structure of such explanations. It is thus assumed that there is a single kind or form of explanation that is “scientific”. In fact, the notion of “scientific explanation” suggests a contrast between those “explanations” that are characteristic of “science” and those explanations that are not, and, second, a contrast between “explanation” and something else. However, the tendency in much of the recent philosophical literature has been to assume that there is a substantial continuity between the sorts of explanations found in science and at least some forms of explanation found in more ordinary non-scientific contexts, with the latter embodying in a more or less inchoate way features that are present in a more detailed, precise, rigorous etc. form in the former. It is further assumed that it is the task of a theory of explanation to capture what is common to both scientific and at least some more ordinary forms of explanation.

A notable theory of scientific explanation in Hempel's Deductive-nomological model. This model has been widely criticized but it is still the starting point for discussion of most theories of explanation.

Explanations vs. arguments 

The difference between explanations and arguments reflects a difference in the kind of question that arises. In the case of arguments, we start from a doubted fact, which we try to support by arguments. In the case of explanations, we start with an accepted fact, the question being why is this fact or what caused it. The answer here is the explanation.

For instance, if Fred and Joe address the issue of whether or not Fred's cat has fleas, Joe may state: "Fred, your cat has fleas. Observe the cat is scratching right now." Joe has made an argument that the cat has fleas. However, if Fred and Joe agree on the fact that the cat has fleas, they may further question why this is so and put forth an explanation: "The reason the cat has fleas is that the weather has been damp." The difference is that the attempt is not to settle whether or not some claim is true, but to show why it is true. In this sense, arguments aim to contribute knowledge, whereas explanations aim to contribute understanding.

While arguments attempt to show that something is, will be, or should be the case, explanations try to show why or how something is or will be. If Fred and Joe address the issue of whether or not Fred's cat has fleas, Joe may state: "Fred, your cat has fleas. Observe the cat is scratching right now." Joe has made an argument that the cat has fleas. However, if Fred and Joe agree on the fact that the cat has fleas, they may further question why this is so and put forth an explanation: "The reason the cat has fleas is that the weather has been damp." The difference is that the attempt is not to settle whether or not some claim is true, but to show why it is true.

Arguments and explanations largely resemble each other in rhetorical use. This is the cause of much difficulty in thinking critically about claims. There are several reasons for this difficulty.

 People often are not themselves clear on whether they are arguing for or explaining something.
 The same types of words and phrases are used in presenting explanations and arguments.
 The terms 'explain' or 'explanation,' et cetera are frequently used in arguments.
 Explanations are often used within arguments and presented so as to serve as arguments.

Explanation vs. justification

The term explanation is sometimes used in the context of justification, e.g., the explanation as to why a belief is true. Justification may be understood as the explanation as to why a belief is a true one or an account of how one knows what one knows. It is important to be aware when an explanation is not a justification. One may give a detailed and believable account on something without giving a single proof.

Types 
There are many and varied events, objects, and facts which require explanation. So too, there are many different things that can be used to explain something. Aristotle recognized four archetypes of explanation. These were thought, since even more ancient times, to be universal and unique 'kinds' of explanation that comprise all ways of explaining something. However, there is much confusion about their precise definition and how they relate to each other. Types of explanation involve appropriate types of reasoning, such as Deductive-nomological, Functional, Historical, Psychological, Reductive, Teleological, Methodological explanations.

Theories of explanation

Deductive-nomological model
Statistical relevance model
Causal Mechanical model
Unificationist model
Pragmatic theory of explanation

See also

 Abductive reasoning
 Epistemology
 Explanandum and explanans
 Explanatory gap
 Inductive reasoning
 Inquiry
 Knowledge
 Models of scientific inquiry
 Rationalization
 Scientific method
 Theory
 Unexplained (disambiguation)
 Wesley Salmon

Further reading 
 Moore, Brooke Noel and Parker, Richard. (2012) Critical Thinking. 10th ed. Published by McGraw-Hill. .

References

External links

 
 
 
 Explanation in several languages and meanings

Critical thinking
Concepts in logic
Epistemology of science
Theories
Causality